Baba Pir (also Romanized as Bābā Pīr) is a village in Korzan Rud Rural District, in the Central District of Tuyserkan County, Hamadan Province, Iran. At the 2006 census, its population was 1,502, in 448 families.

References 

Populated places in Tuyserkan County